The TT language is a style guide from the Swedish news agency Tidningarnas Telegrambyrå (TT). The TT language contains recommendations on how media of Sweden should express themselves in writing, to maintain good use of language.

References

Style guides
Mass media in Sweden
Swedish language